High Tide is an American television series created by Jeff Franklin and Steve Waterman and starring Rick Springfield and Yannick Bisson.  The syndicated procedural aired from 1994 to 1997 and lasted 72 episodes over three seasons.

Premise
Mick Barrett, a former police officer, works as a private detective with his younger brother Joey in San Diego. For their work, they travel to exotic locales and, in their free time, they are surfers. At the beginning of the series, they work primarily for Gordon, a retired CIA agent.

Cast
Rick Springfield as Mick Barrett (69 episodes)
Yannick Bisson as Joey Barrett (63 episodes)
Julie Lynn Cialini as Annie (unknown episodes)
Mary Ann Schmidt as Bikini Beauty (17 episodes)
Diana Frank as Fritz (7 episodes)
George Segal as Gordon (7 episodes)

Episodes

Season 1 (1994–95)

Season 2 (1995–96)

Season 3 (1996–97)

Production
George Segal appeared in a prominent recurring role in the first season, starting with the pilot. Though the first season was filmed in Auckland, New Zealand, the latter two seasons were filmed in California. Guest stars included Lucy Lawless, Sally Kirkland, Denise Richards, Thomas Jane, Patrick Wayne, and John Pinette.

Episode status

, the series is currently available for streaming online on Crackle in the United States and the CTV Television Network's streaming service, CTV Throwback in Canada.

References

External links
 

1990s New Zealand television series
1994 American television series debuts
1997 American television series endings
English-language television shows
First-run syndicated television programs in the United States
Surfing mass media
American detective television series
Television series by Sony Pictures Television
Television shows set in Auckland
Television shows set in San Diego
Fictional portrayals of the San Diego Police Department
Television series by Fremantle (company)